Hall of Honor may refer to:

Military 

 National Purple Heart Hall of Honor, Windsor, New York
Michigan Military and Veterans Hall of Honor, Jackson, Michigan
 Texas A&M University Corps of Cadets Hall of Honor, College Station, Texas
Texas Military Hall of Honor, Austin, Texas
 United States Army Officer Candidate School Hall of Honor, Columbus, Georgia
 United States Army Ranger Hall of Honor, Columbus, Georgia
 United States National Security Agency Hall of Honor, Fort Meade, Maryland
 United States Naval Aviation Hall of Honor, Pensacola, Florida

Music 

 International Bluegrass Music Hall of Fame, Owensboro, Kentucky (until 2006 known as the International Bluegrass Music Hall of Honor)

Sports 
 Pac-12 Conference Hall of Honor
Texas A&M University Athletics Hall of Honor
 University of Michigan Athletic Hall of Honor
 University of Texas Men's Athletics Hall of Honor
 University of Texas Women's Athletics Hall of Honor

Other
 Hall of Honour at the Centre Block of Parliament Hill, Ottawa, Canada
Texas Heritage Hall of Honor, Dallas, Texas

See also 
 Hall of fame